The fifth season of the series Show Me the Money, known as Show Me the Money 5 (also referred to as SMTM5), premiered on May 6, 2016 and ended July 15, 2016. It is on broadcast every Friday at 23:00 KST on Mnet.

Mnet's fifth season of SMTM features YG Entertainment judges Kush and Zion.T, Dok2 and The Quiett from Illionaire Records, AOMG co-CEO Simon Dominic and producer Gray, and judges Mad Clown and Gill of Leessang. A record-breaking number of 9,000 contestants auditioned this season.

The process of SMTM5 was similar to that of Show Me the Money 4 with open auditions where contestants were asked for an a cappella rap, but for the first time LA auditions were also held in addition to the traditional audition in Seoul. American rapper Timbaland was a guest judge during Round 2 of the LA auditions.

Judges 
Team YG:
 Kush: Co-head of The Black Label, an independent sub-label of YG Entertainment. Producer of hit songs and former member of Stony Skunk
 Zion.T: Singer and producer under The Black Label and member of VV:D crew alongside Gray. Previously an artist under Amoeba Culture
Team AOMG:
 Simon Dominic: Former co-CEO of AOMG, rapper and former member of duo Supreme Team
 Gray: Producer, rapper, and singer under AOMG, and member of the VV:D crew alongside Zion.T.
Team Illionaire:
 Dok2: Co-CEO of Illionaire Records and rapper. He also participated in SMTM3 as a judge.
 The Quiett: Co-CEO of Illionaire Records and rapper. He also participated in SMTM3 as a judge.
Team Mad Clown & Gill:
 Mad Clown: Rapper under Starship Entertainment . He was also a contestant from Show Me The Money 2.
 Gill: Rapper, producer in hip-hop duo Leessang, former member of underground rap group Honey Family.

Teams
Team YG
 C Jamm : Former SMTM3 semi-finalist. Signed under Just Music label. Member of $exy Street with BewhY
 Reddy : Hi-Lite Records rapper. Previously auditioned for Superstar K as a rapper for All-Male K-Pop group BTS but did not make it pass the auditions.
 Killagramz :  Rapper from LA signed under Cycadelic Records
 Xitsuh : Freestyle rapper that was Formerly a part of the Angdreville crew. Gained popularity after he was eliminated during the freestyle round in SMTM4. Known previously on SMTM as Seo Chul Gu.

Team AOMG
 G2 : Signed under Hi-Lite Records.
 BewhY : Gained popularity after his elimination on SMTM4, Known as a member of the duo Sexy Street with C Jamm.
 ONE : Rapper formerly signed under YG Entertainment On July 17, 2019 he left YG Entertainment and opened his own entertainment company called Private Only and formerly part of the duo 1PUNCH. He was on Team ZiPal during SMTM4.
 DayDay : Producer/songwriter of boy band DMTN (Dalmatian). He was a member of Team AOMG during SMTM4 and went by his birthname, David Kim.

Team Mad Clown & Gill
 Sanchez : Known primarily as the singer and producer of Phantom under Brand New Music, he is the older brother of SMTM4 contestant Microdot and started as a rapper under the name "Fassnakuh."
 Donutman : Independent rapper, previously signed with the defunct Soul Company and member of Clarity Crew
 #Gun : Competed in Starship Entertainment's No Mercy competition show for a chance to become part of idol group Monsta X, but was not chosen. He is also cousins with SMTM4 runner-up Song Min-ho. Signed under Starship Entertainment.
 Boi B : Rapper in Rhythm Power under Amoeba Culture.

Team Illionaire
 myunDo : Participant of SMTM in the past, but was eliminated during the one-on-one rap battle round. Part of "82 Hottest MC's" with Superbee.
 Flowsik : Former member of Aziatix, entered the competition through the LA auditions. Timbaland's favorite of the LA auditions. Previously signed with Lil Wayne's Cash Money Records from 2013 to 2014.
 Kim Hyo-eun : Previously participated in SMTM3 in which he caused stir with rapper Tarae for winning their 1 on 1 battle round. Also known by his moniker "Kenny Raw". Currently signed with Illionaire Records' Sub-Unit Company "Ambition Musik"
 Superbee : A member of Team YG during SMTM4, he returned to SMTM5 through the LA auditions. Has participated in all seasons of SMTM. Part of "82 Hottest MC's" with myunDo.

Rounds 
Round One: Contestants must rap a cappella in front of a judge. The contestants are given a necklace if they pass.
Round Two: Contestants prepare a one-minute rap using the beat of their choice and rap in front of all the judges. In order to pass onto the next round, they must receive at least one pass.

Notable Rappers at the One-Minute Rap Round

 PASSED by the Producer Team 
 FAILED by the Producer Team 
(*) Received an ALL-PASS from the Producer Teams but was placed on the Fair Cypher Group during the Cypher sessions.

Round Three: Contestants pair up for a 1v1 rap battle. Prior to this round, all the rappers participate in a cypher in order to assess each other's skills. Only one person can win the battle and move onto the next round. Unlike previous seasons, there was no revival round in SMTM5.

(*) Received an ALL-PASS from the Producer Teams but was placed on the Fair Cypher Group during the Cypher sessions.

 Winner advances to the Team Selection Round.
(*) Miss LA (from the LA auditions) was chosen by the show's producers as a replacement for fellow LA contestant Legendary Temo after not making it to the later rounds due to Visa Issues. Unlike the other LA rappers that made it through auditions, she did not participate in the Cypher Round of the show.

Round Four: Contestants and judges must choose each other for the contestant to become part of the Top 16. If the contestant fails to get a match with one of the judging teams, they are eliminated. This round deviates from the typical SMTM team selection process.
Round Five: The new teams participate in a team song mission to assess their rapping and teamwork skills. The worst rapper in the team is eliminated by their team's producers.

Round Six: Team diss battles.

 The team won during the diss round and gains the advantage of having three contestants participate in the live performances instead of just two.
 Winner of their respective match-ups
Round Seven: Following the results of the team diss battles, losing teams face against each other and winning teams face against each other at the live performances. Losing team producers choose one rapper to perform during the live show. The two remaining rappers write verses for a collaboration song written by their producers. Prior to the live show, the two rappers go through a mic-selection, where the producers choose one rapper to perform with them. The other rapper is eliminated from the show. Meanwhile, the winning teams choose one rapper to perform on their own and the remaining two rappers perform a song together.

 The contestant won against his opponent during the live performance and moved onto the next round.
 The contestant lost against his opponents but was saved to move onto the next round. 
Round Eight: Semi-finals. - The remaining six contestants will have solo performances with a special guest performer(s) with each of them matched-up against another contestant. The contestant who earned more amount of money during their match-up will advance to the final round, while the other gets eliminated.

 The contestant won against his opponent during the live performance and moved onto the next round.

Bold : Indicates Top 3 contestants advancing to the final round.

Round Nine: Finals – The final round is televised live with 50% of the votes from the TV audience and the remaining 50% from the live audience. In the first part of the finals, all three remaining finalists will perform live on stage with their producers. The finalist who receives the least money through audience votes in the first part of the finals will be eliminated. In the second part of the finals, the final two contestants will have one last performance alone or with a special guest featuring. The contestant who earned the most money will be this season's champion.

 Indicates Top 2 contestants advancing to the next round.

 Indicates winner of Show Me The Money 5.

Notable contestants

 WINNER  The contestant won Show Me the Money 5.
 Runner-Up  The contestant was the runner-up.
 3rd place  The contestant was the 3rd place.
 ALL-PASS  The contestant received an All-Pass during the second round.
 GOOD  The contestant received one fail during the second round.
 FAIR  The contestant received two fails during the second round.
 LOW  The contestant only received one pass during the second round.
 ELIM  The contestant was eliminated.
 WON  The contestant's team won during the diss battle round.
 PASS  The contestant won against his opponent during the live performance and moved onto the next round.
 SAVED  The contestant lost against his opponent but was saved to move onto the next round.
 ELIM  The contestant was not chosen to perform in the live performance.
 The contestant did not participate in this round.

Discography

References

 
2016 South Korean television seasons